Shamsabad (also Romanized as Shamsābād) is a village in Tombi Golgir Rural District, Golgir District, Masjed Soleyman County, Khuzestan Province, Iran. At the 2006 census, its population was 97, in 17 families.

References 

Populated places in Masjed Soleyman County